Saint Gwrhai was a 5th-century saint of Wales.

He is known from a 10th-century hagiography and is of  disputed historicity. He was reputedly the founder of the Church at Penystrywad, Montgomeryshire, and one at Caerleon. He was a colleague of Deiniol and was a son of Caw of Strathclyde. He is supposedly buried in the churchyard at Penystrywad.

References

5th-century Welsh people
Welsh Roman Catholic saints
Medieval Welsh saints
Year of birth unknown